At the 1960 Summer Olympics in Rome, 15 swimming events were contested, eight for men and seven for women.  There was a total of 380 participants from 45 countries competing.  For the first time, the 4×100 metres medley relay was contested.  The United States topped the medal standings with a total of 15 medals (9 gold), while Australia finished close second with 13 medals (5 gold). 16-years-old phenom Chris von Saltza won four medals, three of them gold.

Medal table

Medal summary

Men's events

Women's events

100m men's freestyle controversy
Results were decided by finish judges who relied on their eyes and did not use replays.  Three judges were assigned to each finishing position.  There were three official timers in 1960 for each lane and swimmer, all timing by hand.  All three timers for Devitt, in lane three, timed him in 55.2 seconds.  The three timers for lane four timed Lance Larson in 55.0, 55.1, and 55.1 seconds.

Former Olympic swimmer and FINA co-founder Max Ritter inspected the judge's scorecards.  Two of the three first-place judges found that Devitt had finished first and the third found for Larson.  Of the three-second-place judges, two found that Devitt finished second and one found that Larson was second.  Ritter pointed out to chief judge Henry Runströmer of Sweden that the scorecards indicated a tie.  Runstrümer cast the deciding vote and declared Devitt the winner.  However, the rules at that time did not provide for the chief judge to have a vote or give him the right to break ties. Ties were supposed to be broken by referring to the timing machine.  The official results placed Devitt first and Larson second, both with the identical time of 55.2 seconds. The United States team appealed, bolstered by videotaped footage of the finish that appeared to show Larson the winner. The appeal jury, headed by Jan de Vries, also the President of FINA in 1960, rejected the appeal, keeping Devitt the winner. This controversy would pave the way for electronic touchpads to be included in swimming events to determine finish and accurate timing.

Participating nations
380 swimmers from 45 nations competed.

References

 
1960 Summer Olympics events
1960
1960 in swimming